Roman Trekel (born Pirna near Dresden in 1963) is a German operatic baritone and Lied-singer. He was awarded the title of Kammersänger in 2000.

References

German operatic baritones
1963 births
Living people
Academic staff of the Hochschule für Musik Hanns Eisler Berlin
Oehms Classics artists
Echo (music award) winners